26 minutes (26’) was a weekly French-language Swiss television comedy program starring Vincent Kucholl and Vincent Veillon. It was aired between 2015 and 2017 on RTS Un, succeeding their daily radio program 120 secondes (120’’) from 2011 to 2014 on Couleur 3 (Radio télévision suisse).

In 2017, 26 minutes was also broadcast with German subtitles on SRF zwei.

Since August 2018, Vincent Kucholl and Vincent Veillon revived the series with a monthly 120 minutes on RTS Un and a weekly 120 secondes on La Première.

Cast 

Vincent Kucholl, born in 1975, studied political science at the University of Lausanne and is the director of the book collection "Comprendre" from the publication Éditions loisirs et pédagogie[fr](Leisure and Education).

Vincent Veillon, born in 1986, studied new media at the École cantonale d'art de Lausanne. He is the son of Pierre-François Veillon, who was a member of the Grand Council of Vaud, the Council of State of Vaud, and the National Council of Switzerland.

120 secondes 

The format of 120 secondes is an interview of a fake personality played by Vincent Kucholl, by Vincent Veillon, who is portraying a journalist. It was broadcast daily at 7:50 AM on Couleur 3 and then available on YouTube and Dailymotion; each video produced was viewed about 60,000 times with peaks at 80,000 for burning questions.

After their success on the radio, Vincent Kucholl and Vincent Veillon developed and presented a theatre show called "120’’ présente la Suisse" in 2013-2014. They had 145 performances throughout French-speaking Switzerland. The show is inspired by the radio programme and by the collection "LEP Référence" that Vincent Kucholl was directing for the Éditions Loisirs et pédagogie.

26 minutes 

Following the previous radio program, the television program 26 minutes ran from 2015 to 2017. It was filmed on Fridays in a Lausanne nightclub (Chauderon 18) and was broadcast on Saturdays at 8:10 PM on RTS Un and on Sundays at 8:00 PM on RTS Deux. In 2015, Vincent Kucholl and Vincent Veillon were also invited to perform at the Paléo Festival.

The hundredth and last episode was broadcast on 16 December 2017.

See also 
 Juice Rap News, in Australia
 Les Guignols, in France

Notes and references

External links

 Official website of 26 minutes (YouTube)
 Page of 120 secondes (YouTube)

Swiss television series
Swiss radio programmes
2015 Swiss television series debuts
2010s Swiss television series
Radio Télévision Suisse original programming